Black Moor is a Canadian heavy metal band formed in 2005 in Cole Harbour, Nova Scotia, Canada. Since their inception, they have worked steadily to expand their fanbase and refine their sound, described as "retro, riding that familiar border between traditional heavy metal and speed metal, putting the band squarely in the New Wave of Traditional Heavy Metal camp."

In June 2008, the members of Black Moor were involved in a car accident while on their way home from playing a show in Montreal. All survived, but the crash left drummer Sylvain Coderre with severe injuries and the accident set back production on the band's debut album The Conquering by almost a year.

In 2009, the group signed to Halifax-based Diminished Fifth Records and released their debut album The Conquering. They released the album Lethal Waters in 2012, and Brave to the Grave in 2016.

Members
Eric Hanlin — Rhythm Guitar / Vocals
Evan Frizzle — Lead Guitar / Vocals
Brycen Gunn — Bass / Vocals
Bobby Webb — Drums

Past members
Rob Nickerson — bass
Kenny Myers — drums
Sylvain Coderre — drums
Nick Jones — lead guitar

Discography
 The Conquering – 2009, Diminished Fifth Records
 Lethal Waters – 2012, Diminished Fifth Records
 Brave To The Grave – 2016, Self-Released

References

Musical groups from Halifax, Nova Scotia
Musical groups established in 2005
Canadian heavy metal musical groups
2005 establishments in Nova Scotia